Alan Tindal Lennox-Boyd, 1st Viscount Boyd of Merton, CH, PC, DL (18 November 1904 – 8 March 1983), was a British Conservative politician.

Background, education and military service
Lennox-Boyd was the son of Alan Walter Lennox-Boyd by his second wife Florence Annie, daughter of James Warburton Begbie and Anna Maria née Reid. He had an elder half-sister and three full brothers, two of whom were killed in the Second World War and one who died in Germany in April 1939. He was educated at Sherborne School, Dorset, and graduated from Christ Church, Oxford, with a BA later promoted to MA. In the Second World War he saw active service as a lieutenant in the Royal Naval Volunteer Reserve with Coastal Forces.

Political career
Lennox-Boyd was elected as Member of Parliament (MP) for Mid Bedfordshire in 1931 (at the age of 26), and was admitted to Inner Temple, as a barrister in 1941. He was a member of Winston Churchill's peacetime government as Minister for Transport and Civil Aviation from 1952 to 1954. In this post he once memorably opined that road accidents were the result not of the taking of large risks, but of the taking of small risks very large numbers of times.

As a Minister, he opened the third Woodhead Tunnel on the British Railways electrified railway across the Pennines on 3 June 1954.

In 1954, he became Secretary of State for the Colonies, where he oversaw early stages of decolonisation, with the granting of independence to Cyprus, Ghana, Iraq, Malaya and Sudan. He was in office during the Mau Mau Rebellion in Kenya, and was persuaded to stay in office by Harold Macmillan after being censured for the Hola massacre. He talked openly about independence for the Federation of Malaya, and invited the then Chief Minister of Malaya, Tunku Abdul Rahman and his colleagues to Lancaster House to discuss the possibility of independence.

In 1955, Lennox-Boyd threatened to resign from his post when some Tory cabinet members wanted to apply immigration controls to New Commonwealth countries. This was in the early period of the post-Windrush era of immigration to Britain, which had seen an unexpectedly large inflow to Britain from non-white races as a result of the British Nationality Act 1948. This act, implemented by the previous Labour government, granted British citizenship to the entire Commonwealth; in 1955, Lennox-Boyd would either accept controls on the whole Commonwealth or none at all. As the Conservatives were committed to the rights of Old Commonwealth citizens to come to Britain, they chose to have no controls. 

Following the Suez Crisis of 1956, Lennox-Boyd appears to have made the initial approach to writer Ian Fleming about the possibility of Prime Minister Sir Anthony Eden's using Fleming's Jamaican house, Goldeneye, for a rest cure, given the precarious state of Eden's health. Because of security considerations, he initially intimated to Fleming that he wanted Goldeneye for a holiday of his own and, when he resisted Fleming's suggestion that his and Fleming's wife (a close friend of Lady Eden) liaise over the arrangements, Fleming at first assumed that he was planning an extra-marital assignation.

After the 1959 general election, Lennox-Boyd was replaced as Colonial Secretary by Iain Macleod. In September 1960, Lennox-Boyd was raised to the peerage as Viscount Boyd of Merton of Merton-in-Penninghame in the County of Wigtown. This caused a by-election for his Mid Bedfordshire constituency, which was won by Stephen Hastings. He was further honoured the same year when he was appointed a Companion of Honour. Being opposed to the line taken in Harold Macmillan's Wind of Change speech, Lennox-Boyd subsequently became an early patron of the right-wing Conservative Monday Club. Whilst this may appear to contrast with his earlier objection to racialised immigration controls, according to David Goodhart, this was explained by him being "a believer in the imperial idea rather than racial equality".

Other public positions and business career
Lord Boyd of Merton held the office of Deputy Lieutenant of Bedfordshire between 1954 and 1960 and Deputy Lieutenant of Cornwall in 1965. He was managing director of Arthur Guinness & Sons between 1959 and 1967, and was a Companion of Honour and Privy Councillor.

Mau Mau rebellion
In 1952 Lennox-Boyd who was the then minister of state of colonies    made his first official visit to Kenya where he met different groups of people. 

In Nyeri when accompanied by General George Erskine he held a lengthy meeting with Retired Senior Chief Kariithi wa Kamweti in the Kiwarigi village KAR camp. Chief Kariithi had risen through the ranks from a community youth leader in 1900 to an elder and was appointed as a chief in 1912 where he served until he retired in 1935. Chief Kariithi was a champion of Kenyan Independence and a founder member of the Kikuyu Central Association (KCA). The two discussed the state of the nation and the need to grant Kenyans their independence 

In June 1957, Lennox-Boyd, who was Secretary of State for the Colonies, received a secret memorandum written by Eric Griffiths-Jones, the attorney general of Kenya. The letter described the abuse of Mau Mau detainees. The memorandum was passed on by Sir Evelyn Baring, the Governor of Kenya, who is alleged to have added a cover letter asserting that inflicting "violent shock" is the only way to deal with Mau Mau insurgents.

In April 2011 a Guardian report described a cache of government documents which may indicate that, despite clear briefings, Lennox-Boyd repeatedly denied that the abuses were happening, and publicly denounced those colonial officials who came forward to complain.

Personal life
Lord Boyd married Lady Patricia Guinness (1918–2001), daughter of Rupert Guinness, 2nd Earl of Iveagh, on 29 December 1938. His mother-in-law, the Countess of Iveagh, had been an MP in 1927–35 and he was brother-in-law to Sir Henry ('Chips') Channon, also an MP (1935–58), making them jointly a first mother-in-law and child-in-law set of MPs. They had three children:

Simon Lennox-Boyd, 2nd Viscount Boyd of Merton (b. 7 December 1939)
Hon. Christopher Lennox-Boyd (22 July 1941 – 3 August 2012)
Hon. Mark Lennox-Boyd (b. 4 May 1943)

Lord Boyd was knocked down and killed by a car when walking across Fulham Road in London in March 1983, aged 78, and, after cremation, was buried at St Stephen's Church, Saltash, Cornwall. He was succeeded by his eldest son, Simon.

Lady Boyd died in May 2001, aged 83. She gave her name to the Viscountess of Merton cup, awarded at the Cornwall Spring Flower Show.

According to many sources Lennox-Boyd was gay. He is depicted in James Lees-Milne's diary of 1942–1943, Ancestral Voices, as being infatuated with the American aesthete Stuart Preston. His passionate gay love affairs (and their recklessness), are revealed in Channon's diaries. Historian and biographer Michael Bloch describes the former regent and Crown Prince of Iraq, 'Abd al-Ilah, as being homosexual and a "close friend" of Lennox-Boyd. Bloch writes that after 'Abd al-Ilah was killed during the 14 July Revolution in 1958, "the revolutionaries discovered intimate letters from Lennox-Boyd among the Prince's papers, which they released to the world's press."

Arms

References

External links 
 

|-

1904 births
1983 deaths
20th-century British lawyers
Alumni of Christ Church, Oxford
Anglo-Scots
British people of the Mau Mau Uprising
Lennox-Boyd, Alan
Deputy Lieutenants of Bedfordshire
Deputy Lieutenants of Cornwall
LGBT peers
Lennox-Boyd, Alan
English LGBT politicians
Members of the Inner Temple
Members of the Order of the Companions of Honour
Members of the Privy Council of the United Kingdom
Ministers in the Chamberlain peacetime government, 1937–1939
Ministers in the Chamberlain wartime government, 1939–1940
Ministers in the Churchill caretaker government, 1945
Ministers in the Churchill wartime government, 1940–1945
Ministers in the Eden government, 1955–1957
Ministers in the Macmillan and Douglas-Home governments, 1957–1964
Ministers in the third Churchill government, 1951–1955
Viscounts created by Elizabeth II
People educated at Sherborne School
Presidents of the Oxford Union
Road incident deaths in London
Royal Naval Volunteer Reserve personnel of World War II
Royal Navy officers
Secretaries of State for Transport (UK)
Secretaries of State for the Colonies
Lennox-Boyd, Alan
Lennox-Boyd, Alan
Lennox-Boyd, Alan
Lennox-Boyd, Alan
Lennox-Boyd, Alan
Lennox-Boyd, Alan
Lennox-Boyd, Alan
UK MPs who were granted peerages
LGBT military personnel